GRAM domain containing 1B, also known as GRAMD1B, Aster-B and KIAA1201, is a cholesterol transport protein that is encoded by the GRAMD1B gene. It contains a transmembrane region and two domains of known function; the GRAM domain and a VASt domain. It is anchored to the endoplasmic reticulum. This highly conserved gene is found in a variety of vertebrates and invertebrates.  Homologs (Lam/Ltc proteins) are found in yeast.

Gene 
GRAMD1B, also known as KIAA1201, is located in the human genome at 11q24.1. It is located on the + strand and is flanked by a variety of other genes. It spans 269,347 bases.

mRNA 
The most verified isoform, isoform 1, contains 21 exons. There are four validated isoform variants of human GRAMD1B. These consist of truncated 5’ and 3’ regions, resulting in the loss of an exon.  One prominent analysis of the mouse gene predicts one form of Gramd1b that is 699 amino acids long.

Protein 
GRAMD1B is an integral membrane protein that contains several domains, motifs and signals.

Domains 
There are two confirmed cytoplasmic domains within GRAMD1B. The protein gets its name from the GRAM domain, located approximately 100 amino acids from the start codon. The GRAM domain is commonly found in myotubularin family phosphatases and predominantly involved in membrane coupled processes. GRAMD1B also contains the VASt (VAD1 Analog of StAR-related lipid transfer) domain. The VASt domain is predominantly associated with lipid binding domains, such as GRAM. It is most likely to function in binding large hydrophobic ligands and may be specific for sterol. A C-terminal domain in GRAMD1B sits within the lumen of the ER, is predicted to have alpha-helical secondary structure, and is modified by tryptophan C-mannosyaltion.

Composition Features 
There are two negative charge clusters, located from amino acids 232-267 and 348-377. The first cluster is not highly conserved, nor is it located in a motif or domain. The second cluster is located directly before the VASt domain and is conserved.

There are three repeat sequence regions, all fairly conserved in orthologs.

Molecular weight and isoelectric point are conserved in orthologs.

Structure 
The protein contains four dileucine motifs, three located within or close to the GRAM domain. A predicted leucine zipper pattern extends through a majority the transmembrane region though it is not a nuclear protein. A SUMOylation site is located directly after the VASt domain. The proteins secondary structure consists of alpha-helices, beta-strands and coils. Beta-strands are mainly located within the two domains, while the alpha-helixes are concentrated near the transmembrane region. Three disulfide bonds are predicted throughout the protein.

Subcellular location 
GRAMD1B is anchored to in the endoplasmic reticulum by a transmembrane domain.

Expression 
GRAMD1B is expressed in a variety of tissues. It is most highly expressed in the gonadal tissue, adrenal gland, brain and placenta. It has raised expression rates in adrenal tumors, lung tumors. Developmentally, it is most highly expressed during infancy. The EST profile is supported with experimental data from multiple sources

Homology

Orthologs 
The ortholog space for GRAMD1B spans a large portion of evolutionary time. GRAMD1B can be found in mammals, bird, fish and invertebrates. Homologous proteins (Lam/Ltc) are found in yeast.

Paralogs  
There are four paralogs of GRAMD1B. The most closely related is GRAMD1A while the most distant ortholog is GRAMD2A/GRAMD2.

Phylogeny 
GRAMD2 diverged earliest in history while the most recent split is GRAMD1A. The GRAMD1B gene’s rate of divergence significantly faster than Fibrinogen but is not as high as Cytochrome C.

Function 
When the plasma membrane contains high levels of cholesterol, GRAMD1b as well as GRAMD1a and GRAMD1c move to sites of contact between the plasma membrane and the endoplasmic reticulum.  GRAMD1 proteins then facilitate the transport of cholesterol into the endoplasmic reticulum.  In the case of GRAMD1b, the plasma membrane source of cholesterol is high-density lipoprotein (HDL).  The VASt domain is responsible for binding cholesterol while the GRAM domain determines the location of the protein through sensing of cholesterol and binding partially negatively charged lipids in the plasma membrane, especially phosphatidylserine.

GRAMD1b is also implicated in transporting carotenoids within the cell.

Protein interactions  
Several different proteins have been experimentally confirmed or predicted to interact with GRAMD1B.

Clinical significance 

Mutations and other genetic studies link GRAMD1B to neurodevelopmental disorders, such as intellectual disability and schizophrenia.  Loss of GRAMD1b results in reduced cholesterol storage in the adrenal gland and serum corticosterone levels in mice.  Reduction of GRAMD1B and GRAMD1C suppresses the onset of a form of non-alcoholic fatty liver disease, non-alcoholic steatohepatitis (NASH) in mice.

A study tagging SNPs from chronic lymphocytic leukemia found GRAMD1B to be the second strongest risk allele region. This association is supported through a number of studies The aberrant tri-methylation of histone H3 lysine 27 induces inflammation and has been shown to increase GRAMD1B levels in colon tumors.

References